Washington Township is a township in DeKalb County, in the U.S. state of Missouri. Its population was 1,844 as of the 2010 census.

References

Townships in Missouri
Townships in DeKalb County, Missouri